Birdie King (バーデイー・キング) is a golf arcade video game released in 1982 by Taito. It was followed by two sequels: Birdie King 2 in 1983, and Birdie King 3 in 1984.

Reception 
In Japan, Game Machine listed Birdie King 2 on their June 1, 1983 issue as being the fourth most-successful table arcade unit of the month.

References 

1982 video games
Arcade video games
Square Enix franchises
Golf video games
Taito arcade games
Trackball video games
Video games developed in Japan